The following is a list of results, conference championships and post-season tournaments accomplished by the Bucknell Bison men's basketball team over the last 122 season all in NCAA Division I.

Seasons

References

Bucknell
Bucknell Bison basketball seasons